Quezon's 4th congressional district is one of the four congressional districts of the Philippines in the province of Quezon, formerly Tayabas. It has been represented in the House of Representatives of the Philippines since 1987. The district consists of municipalities in the Tayabas Isthmus and Alabat Island, namely Alabat, Atimonan, Calauag, Guinayangan, Gumaca, Lopez, Perez, Plaridel, Quezon and Tagkawayan. It is currently represented in the 19th Congress by Keith Micah Tan of the Nationalist People's Coalition (NPC).

Representation history

Election results

2022

2019

2016

2013

2010

See also
Legislative districts of Quezon

References

Congressional districts of the Philippines
Politics of Quezon
1987 establishments in the Philippines
Congressional districts of Calabarzon
Constituencies established in 1987